Westermoor is a municipality in the district of Steinburg, in Schleswig-Holstein, Germany.

References

See also
Moordorf

Steinburg